An election was held in 1969 to elect members to the Bihar Legislative Assembly, the lower house of the legislature of the Indian state of Bihar. After the elections, the Congress emerged as the largest party, and Harihar Singh was sworn in as the Chief Minister of Bihar.

Three parties contested in a 'Triple Alliance'; the Loktantrik Congress Dal, the Praja Socialist Party and the Samyukta Socialist Party. The Triple Alliance divided 295 out of 318 constituencies between them, assigning 23 seats to the Communist Party of India.

Results

Elected members

References

State Assembly elections in Bihar
1960s in Bihar
Bihar